Fenmore may refer to:

Dylan Fenmore, fictional son of Lauren Fenmore Baldwin in the American soap opera The Young and the Restless
Fenmore, Michigan, community within Chapin Township, Michigan, United States
Jill Abbott Fenmore or Jill Foster Abbott, fictional character on the CBS daytime soap opera The Young and the Restless
Lauren Fenmore Baldwin, fictional character from the American soap opera The Young and the Restless

See also
Benmore (disambiguation)
Fenimore (disambiguation)
Fenimorea